Alexandre da Silva A Cerdeira or simply Alex Cerdeira (born 14 April 1980 in Rio de Janeiro) is a Brazilian (Portuguese citizenship) midfielder/striker, who has played in some clubs in Europe, like Apollon Kalamarias, Dundee F.C., Íþróttabandalag Vestmannaeyja, Botev Plovdiv, and had the last contract ended in 2012 with Centro de Futebol Zico Sociedade Esportiva, Brazil. Alex joined Billericay Town F.C. in November 2012 and ended contract in May 2013. He made his first appearance against Cambridge United F.C. in the first round of the FA Trophy.

Cerdeira started his career at local side Vasco.

References

1980 births
Living people
Brazilian expatriate footballers
Billericay Town F.C. players
Dundee F.C. players
CR Vasco da Gama players
America Football Club (RJ) players
Associação Portuguesa de Desportos players
Apollon Pontou FC players
Association football forwards
Scottish Premier League players
Expatriate footballers in Scotland
Botev Plovdiv players
First Professional Football League (Bulgaria) players
Expatriate footballers in Bulgaria
Expatriate footballers in Greece
Brazilian expatriate sportspeople in Bulgaria
Footballers from Rio de Janeiro (city)
Brazilian footballers